Alberto Piercarlo Savini (born 10 June 1999) is an Italian football player. He plays for  club Fidelis Andria.

Club career

Torino
Born in Druento, Savini was a youth exponent of Torino.

Loan to Arconatese
On 19 July 2017, Savini was loaned to Serie D club Arconatese on a season-long loan deal. On 3 September he made his debut for the club in a 2–0 away defeat against Caratese. Three weeks later, on 24 September, he kept his for clean sheet for Arconatese in a 2–0 away win over Derthona. He became Arconatese's first-choice goalkeeper early in the season. On 28 October, Savini kept his second clean sheet in a 1–0 home win against Castellazzo and 3 days later, on 1 November, his third in a 1–0 away win over Seregno. On 29 April 2018, he kept his 10th clean sheet of the season for Arconatese in a 3–0 home win over Bra. Savini ended his season-long loan to Arconatese with 28 appearances, 32 goals conceded and 10 clean sheets.

Loan to Savoia 
On 18 July 2018, Savini was signed by Serie D club Savoia with another season-long loan deal. On 16 September he made his league debut for the club in a 2–0 away defeat against Picerno. One week later, 23 September, he kept his first clean sheet for Savioa, a 0–0 home draw against Francavilla. One more week later, on 30 September, his second in a 1–0 away win over Pomigliano. Savini became Savoia's first-choice keeper early in the season. On 28 October, Savini kept his third clean sheet in a 0–0 away draw against Gragnano. On 13 January 2019, Savini kept his 10th clean sheet of the season in Serie D in a 1–0 away win over Francavilla. Savini ended his second loan in Serie D to Savoia with 34 appearances, 27 goals conceded and 16 clean sheets.

Loan to AlbinoLeffe
On 25 July 2019, Savini joined Serie C club AlbinoLeffe on a season-long loan. He made his professional Serie C debut for AlbinoLeffe on 25 August 2019 in a season-opening game against Pistoiese. He became AlbinoLeffe's first-choice goalkeeper early in the season. On 15 September he kept his first clean sheet for the club in a 0–0 home draw against Pianese and one week later, on 22 September, his second in a 1–0 away win over Arezzo. On 20 October, Savini kept his third clean sheet for the club, a 2–0 home win over Lecco.

AlbinoLeffe
On 20 September 2020 he moved to AlbinoLeffe on a permanent basis.

Fidelis Andria
On 19 August 2022, Savini joined Fidelis Andria.

Career statistics

Club

References

External links
 

1999 births
Sportspeople from the Metropolitan City of Turin
Footballers from Piedmont
Living people
Italian footballers
Association football goalkeepers
Torino F.C. players
U.C. AlbinoLeffe players
S.S. Fidelis Andria 1928 players
Serie C players
Serie D players